Qiz Qalehsi (also Romanized as Qīz Qal‘ehsī; also known as Qez Qal‘ehsī) is a village in Anjirlu Rural District of the Central District of Bileh Savar County, Ardabil province, Iran. At the 2006 census, its population was 811 in 136 households. The following census in 2011 counted 910 people in 205 households. The latest census in 2016 showed a population of 761 people in 217 households; it was the largest village in its rural district.

References 

Bileh Savar County

Populated places in Ardabil Province

Populated places in Bileh Savar County

Towns and villages in Bileh Savar County